Hugh Fortescue, 4th Earl Fortescue  (16 April 1854 – 29 October 1932), styled Viscount Ebrington from 1861 to 1905, was an English Liberal politician who sat in the House of Commons from 1881 until 1892 and later in the House of Lords having inherited his father's peerages. He was a famous sportsman in the hunting-field.

Origins
Fortescue was the son of Hugh Fortescue, 3rd Earl Fortescue (1818–1905), whose main seat was Castle Hill, Filleigh, Devon, by his wife Lady Georgiana Augusta Charlotte Caroline Dawson-Damer, daughter of George Lionel Dawson-Damer and sister of Lionel Dawson-Damer, 4th Earl of Portarlington. He was known by his courtesy title of Viscount Ebrington until his father's death in 1905, when he inherited the earldom.

Career

Education
He was educated at Harrow School and Trinity College, Cambridge. At Cambridge, he was treasurer of the University Pitt Club.

Local career in Devon
He was a captain in the North Devon Hussar Yeoman Cavalry and became Colonel of the North Devon Yeomanry. He was a J.P. for Devon and for South Molton, the town close to the family seat of Castle Hill, Filleigh. He served as Deputy Lieutenant for Devon and was Lord-Lieutenant of Devon from 1903 to 1928.  He was also Chairman of Devon County Council. He was Provincial Grand Master of Freemasons in Devon. He was Master of the Devon and Somerset Staghounds.

National career
He was at one time private secretary to Lord President of the Council Earl Spencer. He was ADC to King Edward VII from 1903 to 1910 and received a KCB in 1911. He was ADC to King George V from 1910 to 1921. He served as president and chairman of the Territorial Force Advisory Council.

Parliamentary career
In 1881 Fortescue was elected as a Liberal Member of Parliament (MP) for Tiverton and held the seat until 1885 when representation was reduced to one member under the Redistribution of Seats Act 1885. In 1885 he was elected MP for Tavistock. When the Liberals split in 1886 over Home Rule for Ireland, he joined the breakaway Liberal Unionists. He held the seat until 1892.

Purchases Exmoor Forest
When Viscount Ebrington he purchased the reversion of about 20,000 acres comprising the former royal forest of Exmoor from Sir Frederick Knight (1812–1897) who with his father John Knight (d.1851) had introduced livestock farming to that previously undeveloped and barren moorland. Following the early death of Knight's son Frederick Sebright Winn Knight (1851–1879) in 1879 aged 28, Knight sold the reversion of Exmoor Forest to Ebrington, that is to say he retained a life interest. Ebrington used the residence constructed by James Boevey in 1654 at Simonsbath, ten miles NE of Castle Hill, as a hunting lodge and for his work in continuing agricultural development. He instituted an annual horse show at Exford, which helped to increase the quality of hunters used on Exmoor.

Death and burial
He died at the age of 78.

Marriage and children
Fortescue married his cousin, Hon. Emily Ormsby-Gore, daughter of William Ormsby-Gore, 2nd Baron Harlech, on 15 July 1886. They had three children:
Hugh William Fortescue, 5th Earl Fortescue (1888–1958)
Geoffrey Faithful Fortescue (1891–1900), died young.
Denzil George Fortescue, 6th Earl Fortescue (1893–1977)

Further reading

References

External links 
 

1854 births
1932 deaths
People educated at Harrow School
Alumni of Trinity College, Cambridge
Fortescue,4
Knights Commander of the Order of the Bath
Lord-Lieutenants of Devon
Ebrington, Hugh Fortescue, Viscount
Ebrington, Hugh Fortescue, Viscount
Ebrington, Hugh Fortescue, Viscount
Ebrington, Hugh Fortescue, Viscount
Ebrington, Hugh Fortescue, Viscount
UK MPs who inherited peerages
Members of Devon County Council
Royal North Devon Yeomanry officers
Hugh,4
Liberal Unionist Party peers
Members of the Parliament of the United Kingdom for Tavistock